William Biddick Jr. (June 29, 1920 – July 3, 2012) served two terms in the California Assembly and during World War II he served in the United States Navy. Later, he served as a superior court judge in the San Joaquin Superior Court, after the retirement of Judge Marion Woodward. A graduate of Stanford Law School, he practiced law in Stockton, CA for 12 years, as a deputy district attorney and the Stockton City Attorney.

Personal
Biddick married Dorothy Thompson. Together, they had five children.

References

United States Navy personnel of World War II
Members of the California State Legislature
1920 births
2012 deaths
Stanford Law School alumni